CBS Sports Classic is an annual American men's college basketball event that began in 2014. 

Four teams are participating: Kentucky, North Carolina, Ohio State, and UCLA. Each team has played one game each year, with the four teams completing a double-header—both games the same day. Both games are annually broadcast on U.S. television on CBS Sports.

On December 13, 2016, the CBS Sports Classic was renewed for three more years. On April 27, 2020, the CBS Sports Classic was renewed again through 2022.  On July 21, 2022, the CBS Sports Classic was renewed through 2026.

Game results

  No attendance due to COVID-19 pandemic.
  Canceled due to COVID-19 issues at UCLA.
  Canceled due to COVID-19 issues at Ohio State.
  Due to UCLA and Ohio State missing the CBS Sports Classic in 2021, CBS, Kentucky, and North Carolina reached an agreement for the remaining teams to play.

Future match-ups

Head-to-head records

References

External links
 Official site

College men's basketball competitions in the United States
College basketball competitions
Recurring sporting events established in 2014
Classic